Nes i Ådal is a small village in the valley of Ådal in the municipality Ringerike in Buskerud, Norway. 

The village lies on both sides of the river Begna, just north of the river's outlet in Lake Sperillen.  It is situated on  European route E16 north of Hønefoss, towards Valdres and Vestlandet. The road to Hedalen splits off from the E16 at Nes.

Nes is a common Norwegian place name. In Old Norse, the word Nes means headland or promontory. In the case of Nes i Ådal, 
the name derives from the old farm Nes, which in medieval times was under the Diocese of Hamar.

TGC Harnessing, a division of T&G Elektro, is the main employer in Nes. It was established 25 years ago. TGC Harnessing is known for supplying specialized cable systems of very high quality. The company is active in both design and production of harnesses and cable systems. 

Nes Church (Nes Kirke) was built to provide a parish for the inhabitants of the eastern side of Lake Sperillen. Nes Church is a stately church with a tall steeple, cream colored wood  siding and a bright red tile roof. The cruciform church dates from 1862. It was built based upon a design by architect Georg Andreas Bull. It was built of wood and has 900 seats. The church is the largest church in Hallingdal.

References

External links
T&G Elektro website
Picture of Nes i Ådal
Nes Church

Villages in Buskerud